Josiah Chapman (12 October 1891 – 1953) was an English footballer who played as a centre half for Rochdale.

References

Rochdale A.F.C. players
Rossendale United F.C. players
English footballers
Footballers from Salford
1891 births
1953 deaths
Association footballers not categorized by position